Cenchrus ciliaris (buffel-grass or African foxtail grass; syn. Pennisetum ciliare (L.) Link) is a species of grass native to most of Africa, southern Asia (east to India), southern Iran, and the extreme south of Europe (Sicily). Other names by which this grass is known include dhaman grass, anjan grass, koluk katai and buffelgrass.

Description

Distribution
African foxtail grass is native to tropical Africa, the Mediterranean region and the hotter and drier parts of Asia. It is considered a good forage grass in Africa. It prefers light soils with a high phosphorus content. It is also sown in Queensland, Australia and elsewhere for grazing, hay and silage. It was introduced to the Sonoran Desert for erosion control and to feed livestock. In the Mexican part of the Sonoran Desert, it is still being planted and irrigated for livestock grazing. Cenchrus ciliaris has become naturalised and often an invasive species in Australia, the southwestern United States, Hawaii, Mexico, Central America, South America, and Macaronesia.

As an invasive species
It was introduced in the 1930s into Arizona, United States, to provide grazing. The introduction was largely unsuccessful but the grass began to appear as a weed beside highways and in cleared fields or over-grazed land. It spreads very quickly and will often kill local native plants, such as palo verdes, by taking away nearby water. This plant has a very low ignition threshold and can burn even during the peak growing season. Its flammability (injurious to neighbors) and quick regrowth allow it to compete successfully against almost all vegetation in the Sonoran Desert region.

Another problem of buffelgrass in the Sonoran Desert is that it intensifies wildfires such that saguaro cacti that normally survive wildfires can erupt into flames when growing in areas taken over by the grass.

In Queensland, Australia, the grass has also been attributed to causing a decline in the native grass species fed on by the critically endangered northern hairy-nosed wombat, and cited as a factor in the wombats' decline. In South Australia, it is a declared plant under the Natural Resources Management Act and weed management activities are guided by the South Australia Buffel Grass Strategic Plan (2012–17).
In Australia's Northern Territory, invasive buffel grass was implicated in making fire control more challenging following the extensive wild fires that destroyed ancient trees in oases such as Standley Chasm in February 2019.

References

External links
 

ciliaris
Grasses of Africa
Flora of North Africa
Flora of Western Asia
Flora of Iran
Flora of Morocco
Grasses of India
Grasses of Pakistan
Flora of Sicily
Forages